St Thomas Cross Platform was a railway station used by workmen's trains on the  to  line on what is now the southeastern, Cringlethwaite, edge of Egremont, Cumbria, England.

History and location
The line on which the halt was built was one of the fruits of the rapid industrialisation of West Cumberland in the second half of the nineteenth century. Tracks were laid southwards from Whitehaven and Moor Row as far as Egremont by the Whitehaven, Cleator and Egremont Railway, opening to passengers on 1 July 1857. The Furness opposed this, but the two companies came to an accommodation and built the Egremont to Sellafield extension as a joint line.

St Thomas Cross Platform was a Twentieth Century addition to the line.

The use of the term "Platform" usually signified that a station was an unstaffed halt. The halt must have been closed by 1933, when the structure was demolished. It was used by workers at the nearby Florence mine, which went on to be the last operating iron ore mine, as opposed to quarry, in Western Europe. It closed in 2008.

The halt does not appear on the relevant 1928 Railway Clearing House junction diagram or in Jowett.

The station is not marked on contemporary OS maps up to 6" to the Mile, but an unlabelled building with a footpath to the road is shown in the right place on the Cumberland 1:2,500 scale OS map linked below via Old OS Maps.

Afterlife
By 2013 the trackbed through the halt was clearly visible on satellite images, but the site itself appeared to be privately occupied.

See also

 Furness Railway
 Cleator and Workington Junction Railway
 Whitehaven, Cleator and Egremont Railway

References

Sources

Further reading

External links
Possible representation of the platform on a 1925 OS map, via Old OS Maps
The station not on the line with Engineer's Line References, via railwaycodes.org.uk
Map of the line with photos, via RAILSCOT
The station not on overlain OS maps surveyed from 1898, via National Library of Scotland
The station not on a 1948 OS Map, via npe maps
The railways of Cumbria, via Cumbrian Railways Association
Photos of Cumbrian railways, via Cumbrian Railways Association
The railways of Cumbria, via Railways_of_Cumbria
Cumbrian Industrial History, via Cumbria Industrial History Society
Furness Railtour using many West Cumberland lines 5 September 1954, via sixbellsjunction
A video tour-de-force of the region's closed lines, via cumbriafilmarchive
Haematite, via earthminerals

Disused railway stations in Cumbria
Railway stations in Great Britain opened in 1912
Railway stations in Great Britain closed in 1933